The 1938 European Championship can refer to European Championships held in several sports:

 1938 European Rugby League Championship
 1938 European Championships in Athletics
 1938 Grand Prix season